Hollywood Reservoir, also known as Lake Hollywood, is a reservoir located in the Hollywood Hills, situated in the Santa Monica Mountains north of the Hollywood neighborhood of Los Angeles, California. It is maintained by the Los Angeles Department of Water and Power. The reservoir and surrounding neighborhood lie east of the Hollywood Freeway and are overlooked from a distance by the Hollywood Sign.

The reservoir is created by the Mulholland Dam, built in 1924, designed by the Los Angeles Department of Water and Power, then named the Bureau of Water Works and Supply, as part of the city's water storage and supply system.

Hollywood Reservoir has appeared in films such as Chinatown (1974), where Hollis Mulwray is discovered dead along the shores, and Earthquake (1974). The reservoir is featured in Visiting... with Huell Howser Episode 915. and the Season 4 opening of the TV Series 9-1-1.

Geography 
During its first years in service the reservoir level varied, though for most of the time it was kept at a high level and was filled on several occasions.

Within days after the collapse of the St. Francis Dam in March 1928, William Mulholland ordered the Hollywood Reservoir lowered due, in part, to public fears of a repeat disaster. Shortly after the disaster and in the years following, several engineering panels met to discuss the safety of the dam. These panels of engineers, from both the state and the LADWP came to differing conclusions. In 1931, the LADWP made the decision to permanently keep the Hollywood Reservoir lowered, and keep it to no more than 4,000 acre-feet (4,900,000 m3). The reservoir now is usually maintained at about 2,800 acre-feet (3,500,000 m3).

The surrounding recreational area is known as Lake Hollywood Park, and is open for walking, hiking, and jogging. The reservoir is encircled by a flat, paved road that is suitable for walking and bicycling.

See also
 List of lakes in California

References
Notes

External links
 

Reservoirs in Los Angeles County, California
Hollywood Hills
History of Los Angeles
Landmarks in Los Angeles
Parks in Los Angeles
Santa Monica Mountains
Reservoirs in California
Reservoirs in Southern California